Harlem Township is located in Winnebago County, Illinois. As of the 2010 census, its population was 40,158 and it contained 16,025 housing units.

Geography

Demographics

References

External links
City-data.com
Winnebago County Official Site
Harlem Township Winnebago County Official Website

1849 establishments in Illinois
Populated places established in 1849
Rockford metropolitan area, Illinois
Townships in Illinois
Townships in Winnebago County, Illinois